Wally Pontiff Jr. Playground, formerly Metairie Playground, is a Jefferson Parish public playground located at 1521 Palm Street in Metairie, Louisiana. It is Jefferson Parish's oldest public playground.

Sports

Baseball
The playground offers multiple baseball fields for team and recreational use.

Basketball/Volleyball
The gymnasium is used for basketball games, volleyball games and other recreational uses.

Cross country
The Pontiff Playground cross country course is a 3-mile/4.83 km cross country course in and around Pontiff Playground.

Football/Soccer
The playground has two football/soccer fields for team and recreational use. The playground was the home football venue for the Metairie High School Yellowjackets from 1952 to 1954. The largest crowds were standing room only against Kenner High School in 1952 and against Behrman High School in 1954.

Softball
The playground offers multiple softball fields for team and recreational use.

Tennis
Tennis is played at the Pontiff Playground tennis courts.

Track and field
A running track used for track and field meets is located in the playground.

Playground amenities
The playground contains six baseball diamonds, two football fields, one track, two tennis courts, and a gymnasium. In addition to these sports facilities a spray fountain, meditation labyrinth, meeting center, picnic shelters, playground equipment, dog park and bird sanctuary are located in the facility.

History

Origins
Development of Metairie Playground began in 1945, following the end of World War II and during a time of civic progress in Jefferson Parish. The playground was dedicated in 1952. The playground was renamed on June 28, 2003, in memory of Wally Pontiff, Jr., who played college baseball for Louisiana State University. Pontiff played baseball in his youth at Metairie playground.  Before an unexpected death at the age of 21, Pontiff was deciding whether to continue his career at LSU or to play for the Oakland Athletics after being drafted in the 21st round.

Effects of Hurricane Katrina
Pontiff Playground was flooded in August 2005 during Hurricane Katrina, which ruined the gymnasium.  After the storm, Jefferson Parish built an earthen berm around it to hold water in future emergencies.

Development Timeline

See also 
 Metairie
 Jefferson Parish

References

External links
 Official website

American football venues in New Orleans
Athletics (track and field) venues in New Orleans
Baseball venues in New Orleans
Basketball venues in New Orleans
Cross country running courses in Louisiana
Soccer venues in New Orleans
Softball venues in New Orleans
Tennis venues in New Orleans
Volleyball venues in New Orleans
High school football venues in Louisiana
Parks in Louisiana
Buildings and structures in Jefferson Parish, Louisiana
Tourist attractions in Jefferson Parish, Louisiana
Sports venues completed in 1952
1952 establishments in Louisiana